Incognegro is the independent studio album by American rapper Ludacris. It was released on August 17, 1999, by Ludacris' newly founded indie record label, DTP Entertainment. Recording sessions took place from 1998 to 1999, with Ludacris serving as the record's executive producer, while the additional production was provided by Jermaine Dupri and Organized Noize, among others.

The album was supported by two singles: "Ho" (produced by Bangladesh), and "What's Your Fantasy" (featuring Shawnna, produced by Bangladesh).

Every track would later appear on his second album except for "Intro", "It Wasn't Us", "Midnight Train", & "Rock and a Hard Place".

Singles 
The lead single for his untitled independent album, called "Ho" was released on July 15, 1998. The song was produced by American hip hop record producer Bangladesh.

The second single for Incognegro, "What's Your Fantasy" was released on September 12, 2000. The song features guest verse from an American local rapper Shawnna, while the production was also provided by Bangladesh.

Critical reception

Track listing

Chart positions

References

2000 debut albums
Ludacris albums
Albums produced by Bangladesh (record producer)
Albums produced by Jermaine Dupri